The Center for Jewish Studies Shanghai (CJSS) was established in 1988. It is a department of the Shanghai Academy of Social Sciences. Under the leadership of Dean Professor Pan Guang  CJSS has become the most influential research institute in China studying Judaism and Israeli affairs.

The Center focuses its research on the history of the "Shanghai Jews" (the Holocaust refugees during World War II), the remnants of Jewish communities in China (the largest of which are in Tianjin, Harbin and Kaifeng) and political studies on the Near East. Amongst the publications of the Center are The Jews of China, The Jewish Civilization, The Revitalization of the Jewish People and Jews in China: Legends, History and New Perspectives. 

The Center has organized several national as well as international academic conferences along with so-called Rickshaw Reunions (reunions of Holocaust refugees who survived the Holocaust in Shanghai). The Center has been visited by prominent guests, amongst them Yitzhak Rabin, Ehud Olmert, Gerhard Schröder, Ariel Sharon, Hillary Clinton and then Austrian President Thomas Klestil. 

Since 2006 the CJSS receives each year an Austrian Holocaust Memorial Servant from the Austrian Service Abroad.

See also

Prof. Pan Guang

External links
Center for Jewish Studies Shanghai
Shanghai Academy of Social Sciences

Sources
CJSS
Austrian Service Abroad

Jews and Judaism in Shanghai
Judaic studies
Jewish studies research institutes
Education in Shanghai
Holocaust commemoration